is a Japanese animator, character designer, and director. He is particularly known for his work on the Giant Robo OVA series, as well as his work on the Lunar series and iDOLM@STER. He was born in Hokkaido.

Notable works

Anime
Batman: Gotham Knight (Segment: Working Through Pain; Animation director)
Gunbuster (animation director)
Nadia: The Secret of Blue Water (animation director)
Giant Robo (character designer, animation director)
Giant Robo Ginrei Special (character designer, animation director)
Yamato 2520 (character designer)
Gankutsuou (opening animator)
Beck (storyboard)
Time Jam: Valerian & Laureline (animation director)
Berserk: The Golden Age Arc (director)
Harukana Receive (director)
Wandering Witch: The Journey of Elaina (director)
Handyman Saitō in Another World (director)
Shangri-La Frontier (director)

Games
Lunar: The Silver Star (character designer, animation director)
Lunar: Eternal Blue (character designer, animation director)
Lunar: Walking School (character designer)
Lunar: Silver Star Story (character designer, animation director)
Albert Odyssey: Legend of Eldean (character designer)
Magic School Lunar! (character designer, animation director)
Lunar 2: Eternal Blue (character designer, animation director)
Lunar Legend (character designer)
Seishun Quiz: Colorful Highschool (character designer)
The iDOLM@STER (character designer)
Lunar: Dragon Song (character designer)
Phantasy Star 0 (character designer)

References

External links

Anime character designers
Video game artists
Lunar (series)
Living people
Year of birth missing (living people)